Hendrik Erasmus "Rassie" van der Dussen (born 7 February 1989) is a South African professional cricketer who represents the South Africa national cricket team and plays for Gauteng in domestic cricket. In the 2018 South African Cricket Annual, he was named as one of the five Cricketers of the Year.

In August 2019, van der Dussen was named the International Men's Newcomer of the Year at Cricket South Africa's annual award ceremony. Later the same month, Cricket South Africa awarded him with a central contract for the 2019–20 season.

Domestic career
In August 2017, van der Dussen was named in Cape Town Knight Riders' squad for the first season of the T20 Global League. However, in October 2017, Cricket South Africa initially postponed the tournament until November 2018, with it being cancelled soon after.

van der Dussen was the leading run-scorer during the 2017–18 Sunfoil Series, with 959 runs in ten matches. He was the joint-leading run-scorer in the 2018–19 CSA T20 Challenge tournament, with 348 runs in ten matches. In April 2021, he was named in Gauteng's squad, ahead of the 2021–22 cricket season in South Africa.

T20 franchise career
On 3 June 2018, van der Dussen was selected to play for the Vancouver Knights in the players' draft for the inaugural edition of the Global T20 Canada tournament. He was the leading run-scorer in the tournament for the Vancouver Knights, with 255 runs in eight matches. In the same month, he was named in the squad for the Highveld Lions team for the 2018–19 season.

In October 2018, van der Dussen was named in Jozi Stars' squad for the first edition of the Mzansi Super League T20 tournament. In June 2019, he was selected to play for the Vancouver Knights franchise team in the 2019 Global T20 Canada tournament. In September 2019, he was named in the squad for the Jozi Stars team for the 2019 Mzansi Super League tournament. In December 2019, he was picked by Islamabad United in the supplementary round of the 2020 Pakistan Super League players draft as their last pick.

In July 2020, van der Dussen was named in the St Kitts & Nevis Patriots squad for the 2020 Caribbean Premier League. However, van der Dussen was one of five South African cricketers to miss the tournament, after failing to confirm travel arrangements in due time. In February 2022, he was bought by the Rajasthan Royals in the auction for the 2022 Indian Premier League tournament.

International career
In September 2018, van der Dussen was named in South Africa's Twenty20 International (T20I) series against Zimbabwe. He made his T20I debut for South Africa against Zimbabwe on 9 October 2018. In January 2019, he was named in South Africa's One Day International (ODI) squad for their series against Pakistan. He made his ODI debut for South Africa against Pakistan on 19 January 2019. During his debut, van der Dussen came within just seven runs of scoring a maiden ODI century on debut before he fell for 93. He followed this with an unbeaten 80 at Kingsmead Stadium three days later. He finished the series with 241 runs, averaging 120.5, across the five ODIs.

van der Dussen was then retained for the ODI series against Sri Lanka in March 2019. He scored 112 runs across four ODIs including one fifty and finished the series with an average of 56. In April 2019, he was named in South Africa's squad for the 2019 Cricket World Cup. In December 2019, he was named in South Africa's Test squad for their series against England. He made his Test debut for South Africa, against England, on 26 December 2019. In March 2020, he was awarded with a national contract by Cricket South Africa ahead of the 2020–21 season.

In April 2021, in the first match against Pakistan, van der Dussen scored his first century in an ODI, with 123 not out. At the age of 32 years and 54 days, he also became the oldest cricketer for South Africa to score his first century in an ODI match. In September 2021, van der Dussen was named in South Africa's squad for the 2021 ICC Men's T20 World Cup.

Achievements
In the annual ICC Awards in January 2022, he was named in ICC Men's ODI Team of the Year for the year 2021.

References

External links
 

1989 births
Living people
White South African people
Cricketers from Pretoria
South African cricketers
South Africa Test cricketers
South Africa One Day International cricketers
South Africa Twenty20 International cricketers
Cricketers at the 2019 Cricket World Cup
Northerns cricketers
North West cricketers
Lions cricketers
St Kitts and Nevis Patriots cricketers
Jozi Stars cricketers
Gauteng cricketers
Rajasthan Royals cricketers